Moskovsky is a town in Moskovsky Settlement of Moscow. The town of Moskovsky was formerly located in Leninsky District of Moscow Oblast, Russia, and since July 2012 it is a part of the federal city of Moscow. Population:  

It was founded in 1968 as a rural locality around the agricultural company Mosagro (Agrokombinat "Moskovsky"). Town status was granted to it in 2004. 
On July 1, 2012 Moskovsky was transferred to the city of Moscow and became a part of Novomoskovsky Administrative Okrug.

Route 876 and 876e currently connect Moskovsky with Salaryevo metro station via M3 Highway.

It is to note, however, that transport accessibility from the town to the station is slow: congested highway doesn't provide quick access to the metro station on hours of morning commute, since Moscovsky serves as a gateway from New Moscow to M3 highway.

References

External links
Official website of Moskovsky
Forum residents of Moskovsky town
Official website of Agrokombinat "Moskovsky" 
Unofficial website of Moskovsky 

Moskovsky Settlement
Cities and towns in Moscow (federal city)